Markku Peltola (12 July 1956 – 31 December 2007) was a Finnish actor and musician. He was born and grew up in Helsinki. He was actively involved in founding and acting with the Telakka Theater in Tampere.

Peltola is best known for starring opposite Kati Outinen in Aki Kaurismäki's Academy Award-nominated film from 2002 The Man Without a Past. Other films that Peltola featured in include V2 – jäätynyt enkeli, Young Gods, Drifting Clouds,  Kamome Shokudo, Jade Warrior and Perhoshäkki.

From the 1980s until his death, Peltola was the singer and bass guitarist of the Finnish band Motelli Skronkle. He also released two solo albums: Buster Keatonin ratsutilalla, released by Ektro Records in 2003 and Buster Keaton tarkistaa idän ja lännen at the beginning of 2006.

Peltola died in the early hours of 31 December 2007 at his home in Kangasala, Finland.

Filmography

References

External links
 

1956 births
2007 deaths
Finnish male film actors
Finnish male musicians
20th-century male musicians